The Korea Water Resources Corporation (한국수자원공사, 韓國水資源公社, Korea Water Resources Corporation), or K-water, is the governmental agency for comprehensive water resource development and providing both public and industrial water in South Korea. The Comprehensive Development Plan of Land in August 1966 in accordance with the Korea Water Resources Development Corporation Act was enacted in November 1967. The Korea Water Resources Development Corporation was established in 1987, and the Korea Water Resources Corporation Act enacted in 1988.

Timeline 

 August 3, 1966 - Korea Water Resources Development Corporation Act was enacted
 November 16, 1967 - Korea Water Resources Development Corporation was founded
 June 30, 1973 - Reclamation of Western Industrial Park was completed
 October 15, 1973 - Soyanggangdaem was completed
 November 19, 1973 - Changwon Machinery Industrial Park Development Project was launched
 February 1, 1974 - Industrial Base Development Company was founded
 October 28, 1976 - Andong Multi-Purpose Dam was completed
 December 2, 1980 - Daecheong Dam was completed
 October 17, 1985 - Chungju Dam was completed
 November 16, 1987 - Nakdong River haguduk was completed
 December 4, 1987 - Korea Water Resources Corporation Act was enacted
 July 1, 1988 - Korea Water Resources Corporation was founded
 December 31, 1989 - Hapcheon Multi-Purpose Dam was completed
 November 19, 1993 - 1st construction phase of Ansan Planned Community was completed
 December 13, 1996 - Water supply of Ilsan Planned Community was expanded
 November 2, 2000 - Water supply of Chungju Dam was expanded
 December 30, 2003 - Water supply of Daecheong Dam was expanded
 December 30, 2003 - consignment of Nonsan water supply (first ever consignment agreement of local networks) was concluded

External links 

 Official Website 
 Korea Water Resources Corporation Blog  
  Water Official Blog Naver  
  Supporters college Naver Cafe

References 

Government-owned companies of South Korea
Companies based in Daejeon
Dams in South Korea
Government agencies established in 1967
South Korean companies established in 1967